is a railway station in the city of Hekinan, Aichi Prefecture,  Japan, operated by Meitetsu.

Lines

Station layout
The station  has one side platform serving bi-directional traffic. The station has automatic turnstiles for the Tranpass system of magnetic fare cards, and is unattended.

Adjacent stations

|-
!colspan=5|Nagoya Railroad

Station history
Hekinan-chūō Station was opened on February 5, 1914, as a temporary stop operating only during the summer vacation season for beachgoers on the privately-owned Mikawa Railway Company. It was elevated to the status of a station on July 10, 1915, and named . The Mikawa Railway Company was taken over by Meitetsu on June 1, 1941. The station was renamed to its present name on December 14, 1981.

Passenger statistics
In fiscal 2017, the station was used by an average of 4484 passengers daily (boarding passengers only).

Surrounding area
 Hekinan City Hall
 Hekinan High School
 Chūō Elementary School
 Chūō Junior High School

See also
 List of Railway Stations in Japan

References

External links

 Official web page

Railway stations in Japan opened in 1915
Railway stations in Aichi Prefecture
Stations of Nagoya Railroad
Hekinan, Aichi